The epaulet oriole (Icterus cayanensis) is a species of bird in the family Icteridae. The moriche oriole, formerly considered a distinct species (I. chrysocephalus) is now placed herein as a subspecies. The variable oriole, (I. pyrrhopterus), was formerly considered conspecific, but has recently been split by the SACC.

The epaulet oriole is found in Bolivia, Brazil, Colombia, Ecuador, French Guiana, Guyana, Peru, and Suriname.

Its natural habitats are subtropical or tropical moist lowland forest, subtropical or tropical swamps, subtropical or tropical dry shrubland, and heavily degraded former forest.

References

epaulet oriole
Birds of the Amazon Basin
Birds of the Guianas
epaulet oriole
epaulet oriole
Birds of Brazil
Taxonomy articles created by Polbot